In computing, a news aggregator, also termed a feed aggregator, feed reader, news reader, RSS reader, or simply an aggregator is client software or a web application that aggregates syndicated web content such as online newspapers, blogs, podcasts, and video blogs (vlogs) in one location for easy viewing. The updates distributed may include journal tables of contents, podcasts, videos, and news items.

Function

Visiting many separate websites frequently to find out if the content on the site has been updated can take a long time. Aggregation technology helps to consolidate many websites into one page that can show only the new or updated information from many sites. Aggregators reduce the time and effort needed to regularly check websites for updates, creating a unique information space or personal newspaper. Once subscribed to a feed, an aggregator is able to check for new content at user-determined intervals and retrieve the update. The content is sometimes described as being pulled to the subscriber, as opposed to pushed with email or IM. Unlike recipients of some push information, the aggregator user can easily unsubscribe from a feed. The feeds are often in the RSS or Atom formats which use Extensible Markup Language (XML) to structure pieces of information to be aggregated in a feed reader that displays the information in a user-friendly interface.  Before subscribing to a feed, users have to install either "feed reader" or "news aggregator" applications in order to read it. The aggregator provides a consolidated view of the content in one browser display or desktop application. "Desktop applications offer the advantages of a potentially richer user interface and of being able to provide some content even when the computer is not connected to the Internet. Web-based feed readers offer the great convenience of allowing users to access up-to-date feeds from any Internet-connected computer." Although some applications will have an automated process to subscribe to a news feed, the basic way to subscribe is by simply clicking on the web feed icon and/or text link. Aggregation features are frequently built into web portal sites, in the web browsers themselves, in email applications, or in application software designed specifically for reading feeds. Aggregators with podcasting capabilities can automatically download media files, such as MP3 recordings. In some cases, these can be automatically loaded onto portable media players (like iPods) when they are connected to the end-users computer. By 2011, so-called RSS narrators appeared, which aggregated text-only news feeds, and converted them into audio recordings for offline listening. The syndicated content an aggregator will retrieve and interpret is usually supplied in the form of RSS or other XML-formatted data, such as RDF/XML or Atom.

History 
RSS began in 1999 "when it was first introduced by Internet browser pioneer Netscape". In the beginning, RSS was not a user-friendly gadget and it took some years to spread. "...RDF-based data model that people inside Netscape felt was too complicated for end users." The rise of RSS began in the early 2000s when the New York Times implemented RSS: "One of the first, most popular sites that offered users the option to subscribe to RSS feeds was the New York Times, and the company's implementation of the format was revered as the 'tipping point' that cemented RSS's position as a de facto standard."  "In 2005, major players in the web browser market started integrating the technology directly into their products, including Microsoft's Internet Explorer, Mozilla's Firefox and Apple's Safari." As of 2015, according to BuiltWith.com, there were 20,516,036 live websites using RSS.

Types
Web aggregators gather material from a variety of sources for display in one location. They may additionally process the information after retrieval for individual clients. For instance, Google News gathers and publishes material independent of customers' needs while Awasu is created as an individual RSS tool to control and collect information according to clients' criteria. There are a variety of software applications and components available to collect, format, translate, and republish XML feeds, a demonstration of presentation-independent data.

News aggregation websites

A news aggregator provides and updates information from different sources in a systematized way. "Some news aggregator services also provide update services, whereby a user is regularly updated with the latest news on a chosen topic". Websites such as Google News, Yahoo News, Bing News, and NewsNow where aggregation is entirely automatic, using algorithms which carry out contextual analysis and group similar stories together. Websites such as Drudge Report and HuffPost supplement aggregated news headline RSS feeds from a number of reputable mainstream and alternative news outlets, while including their own articles in a separate section of the website.

News aggregation websites began with content selected and entered by humans, while automated selection algorithms were eventually developed to fill the content from a range of either automatically selected or manually added sources. Google News launched in 2002 using automated story selection, but humans could add sources to its search engine, while the older Yahoo News, as of 2005, used a combination of automated news crawlers and human editors.

Web-based feed readers
Web-based feeds readers allow users to find a web feed on the internet and add it to their feed reader. Online feed readers include Bloglines, Feedly, Inoreader, Facebook News Feed, Flipboard, Digg, News360, My Yahoo!, NewsBlur, Netvibes, Tiny Tiny RSS, and Journali.sm. These are meant for personal use and are hosted on remote servers. Because the application is available via the web, it can be accessed anywhere by a user with an internet connection. There are even more specified web-based RSS readers. For instance, a news aggregator created for scientists: "Michael Imbeault, an HIV researcher at the Université Laval in Quebec, launched his fully automated site called "e! Science News".

More advanced methods of aggregating feeds are provided via Ajax coding techniques and XML components called web widgets. Ranging from full-fledged applications to small fragments of source code that can be integrated into larger programs, they allow users to aggregate OPML files, email services, documents, or feeds into one interface. Many customizable homepage and portal implementations provide such functionality.

In addition to aggregator services mainly for individual use, there are web applications that can be used to aggregate several blogs into one. One such variety—called planet sites—are used by online communities to aggregate community blogs in a centralized location. They are named after the Planet aggregator, a server application designed for this purpose.

Feed reader applications

Feed aggregation applications are installed on a PC, smartphone or tablet computer and designed to collect news and interest feed subscriptions and group them together using a user-friendly interface. The graphical user interface of such applications often closely resembles that of popular e-mail clients, using a three-panel composition in which subscriptions are grouped in a frame on the left, and individual entries are browsed, selected, and read in frames on the right. Some notable examples include NetNewsWire, Flipboard, Prismatic, and Zite.

Software aggregators can also take the form of news tickers which scroll feeds like ticker tape, alerters that display updates in windows as they are refreshed, web browser macro tools or as smaller components (sometimes called plugins or extensions), which can integrate feeds into the operating system or software applications such as a web browser. Clients applications include Mozilla Thunderbird, Microsoft Office Outlook, iTunes, FeedDemon and many others.

Social news aggregators 

One of the examples of social news aggregators is Digg.com. The website collects the most popular stories on the Internet, selected and edited and proposed by a wide range of people. "In these social news aggregators, users submit news items (referred to as "stories"), communicate with peers through direct messages and comments, and collaboratively select and rate submitted stories to get to a real-time compilation of what is currently perceived as "hot" and popular on the Internet." Social news aggregators based on engagement of community. Their responses, engagement level, and contribution to stories create the content and determine what will be generated as RSS feed.

Frame- and media bias-aware news aggregators 
Media bias and Framing (social sciences) are concepts that fundamentally explain deliberate or accidental differences in news coverage. A simple example is a coverage of media in two countries, which are in (armed) conflict with another: one can easily imagine that news outlets, particularly if state-controlled, will report differently or even contrarily on the same events (see for instance Russo-Ukrainian War). While media bias and framing have been subject to manual research for a couple of decades in the social sciences, only recently automated methods and systems have been proposed to analyze and show such differences. Such systems make use of text-features, e.g., NewsCube is a news aggregator that extracts key phrases that describe a topic differently, or other features, e.g., matrix-based news aggregation spans a matrix over two dimensions, such as in which articles have been published (first dimension) and on which country they are reporting (second dimension).

Media aggregators
Media aggregators are sometimes referred to as podcatchers due to the popularity of the term podcast used to refer to a web feed containing audio or video. Media aggregators are client software or web-based applications which maintain subscriptions to feeds that contain audio or video media enclosures. They can be used to automatically download media, playback the media within the application interface, or synchronize media content with a portable media player. Multimedia aggregators are the current focus. EU launched the project Reveal This to embedded different media platforms in RSS system. "Integrated infrastructure that will allow the user to capture, store, semantically index, categorize and retrieve multimedia, and multilingual digital content across different sources – TV, radio, music, web, etc. The system will allow the user to personalize the service and will have semantic search, retrieval, summarization."

Broadcatching
Broadcatching is a mechanism that automatically downloads BitTorrent files advertised through RSS feeds. Several BitTorrent client software applications such as Azureus and μTorrent have added the ability to broadcatch torrents of distributed multimedia through the aggregation of web feeds.

Feed filtering 

One of the problems with news aggregators is that the volume of articles can sometimes be overwhelming, especially when the user has many web feed subscriptions. As a solution, many feed readers allow users to tag each feed with one or more keywords which can be used to sort and filter the available articles into easily navigable categories. Another option is to import the user's Attention Profile to filter items based on their relevance to the user's interests.

RSS and marketing 
Some bloggers predicted the death of RSS when Google Reader was shut down. Later, however, RSS was considered more of a success as an appealing way to obtain information. "Feedly, likely the most popular RSS reader today, has gone from around 5,000 paid subscribers in 2013 to around 50,000 paid subscribers in early 2015 – that's a 900% increase for Feedly in two years." Customers use RSS to get information more easily while businesses take advantage of being able to spread announcements. "RSS serves as a delivery mechanism for websites to push online content to potential users and as an information aggregator and filter for users." However, it has been pointed out that in order to push the content RSS should be user-friendly to ensure proactive interaction so that the user can remain engaged without feeling "trapped", good design to avoid being overwhelmed by stale data, and optimization for both desktop and mobile use. RSS has a positive impact on marketing since it contributes to better search engine rankings, to building and maintaining brand awareness, and increasing site traffic.

See also 
 Comparison of feed aggregators
 History of web syndication technology
 Lifestreaming
 Metasearch engine
 Social network aggregation
 Web feed
 Web syndication

References

External links

 

 
Information Age